Tetratheca labillardierei, also known as Glandular Pink-Bells, is a species of plant in the quandong family that is endemic to Australia.

Description
The species grows as a compact, erect shrub to 100 cm in height. The leaves are 2–20 mm long and usually less than 5 mm wide. The solitary or paired, deep lilac-pink flowers have petals 6–11 mm long, appearing from October to January.

Distribution and habitat
The plants grow in heath and sclerophyll forest, from the Budawang Range of south-eastern New South Wales southwards into Victoria and Tasmania.

References

labillardierei
Flora of New South Wales
Flora of Tasmania
Flora of Victoria (Australia)
Oxalidales of Australia
Taxa named by Joy Thompson
Plants described in 1976